Nico Walther (born 7 June 1990) is a German bobsledder. He competed in the four-man event at the 2018 Winter Olympics winning a silver medal.

References

External links

1990 births
Living people
German male bobsledders
Olympic bobsledders of Germany
Bobsledders at the 2018 Winter Olympics
People from Freital
Olympic medalists in bobsleigh
Olympic silver medalists for Germany
Medalists at the 2018 Winter Olympics
Sportspeople from Saxony